John Joseph "Jack" Brokensha (5 January 1926 – 28 October 2010) was an Australian-born American jazz vibraphonist, known for his work with the Australian Jazz Quartet and Motown Records.

Biography
Brokensha was born in Nailsworth, South Australia. He studied percussion under his father, and played xylophone in vaudeville shows and on radio. He played with the Australian Symphony Orchestra during 1942–44, and played in a band in the Air Force in 1944–46.

Forming his own group, he played in Melbourne in 1947–48, Sydney in 1949–50, Brisbane later in 1950, and Adelaide in 1951. In 1953 he moved to Windsor, Ontario, Canada with Australian pianist Bryce Rohde; they formed the Australian Jazz Quartet the following year with Australian bassoonist/saxophonist Errol Buddle and American saxophonist/flutist/bassist Dick Healey. This ensemble (sometimes recording as a quintet or sextet) toured together until 1958 after a tour of Australia.

Brokensha moved to Detroit, Michigan, where he was hired by Berry Gordy of Motown Records as a percussionist, becoming one of the few white members of Motown's Hitsville U.S.A. recording studio's house band, The Funk Brothers. He was given the nickname "White Jack", to distinguish him from Jack Ashford, an African American percussionist nicknamed "Black Jack".
Brokensha played percussion (mainly vibraphone) on hundreds of records, though Motown routinely did not credit their session musicians until 1971, with the highly acclaimed Marvin Gaye album What's Going On (on which Brokensha played).

In the 1970s he ran a steakhouse from a converted house on Lothrop Street adjacent to the Fisher Building and very close to Berry Gordy’s Hitsville USA. The club was called "Brokensha's",  It was a relatively small club with good food and music. He was occasionally accompanied by his friend and fellow Detroit resident, pianist Bess Bonnier. Teenage jazz guitarist Earl Klugh made his first club appearance at Brokensha's in 1970, playing solo as well as with Jack Brokensha’s Quintet.

Following further tours in Australia with Sammy Davis, Jr. and Stan Freberg, Brokensha founded his own music production company. He did a session with Art Mardigan in 1963, and after this became more active in disc jockeying and writing music for television. He recorded as a leader again in 1980 and continued to lead his own group well into the 1990s.

Brokensha died in Sarasota, Florida, of complications from congestive heart failure, aged 84.

Discography

As leader
And Then I Said (Savoy Records, 1963)
Holiday Innovations (US Steel, 1968)
Boutique (AEM Record Group AEM 25681-2, 1993)
XMazz (AEM Record Group, AEM 25711-2, 1993)

With the Australian Jazz Quartet
Australian Jazz Quartet (Bethlehem BCP-1031, 1955)
The Australian Jazz Quartet (Bethlehem BCP-6003, 1955)
Australian Jazz Quartet/Quintet (Bethlehem BCP-6002, 1956)
The Australian Jazz Quintet at the Varsity Drag (Bethlehem BCP-6012, 1956)
Australian Jazz Quintet Plus One: Jazz in D Minor (Bethlehem BCP-6015, 1957)
Rodgers & Hammerstein (Bethlehem BCP-6022, 1957)
Free Style (Bethlehem BCP-6029, 1958)
Three Penny Opera (Bethlehem BCP-6030, 1958)
Reunion! Recorded Live - Adelaide Town Hall (AEM, AEM 25801-2, 1994)

Other appearances
Music For The Big Scene, Various Artists, (Contrast CRS-1999, 1966)
What's Going On, Marvin Gaye (Tamla Motown, 1971)

References

[ Jack Brokensha] at Allmusic

1926 births
2010 deaths
The Funk Brothers members
American jazz vibraphonists
Australian jazz vibraphonists
Australian expatriates in the United States
Musicians from Adelaide
Savoy Records artists
20th-century Australian musicians
20th-century American musicians
The Australian Jazz Quartet members